(born 20 December 1957) is a Japanese modern pentathlete. He competed at the 1988 Summer Olympics.

References

External links
 

1957 births
Living people
Japanese male modern pentathletes
Olympic modern pentathletes of Japan
Modern pentathletes at the 1988 Summer Olympics
20th-century Japanese people
21st-century Japanese people